The Tokhtamysh–Timur war was fought from 1386 to 1395 between Tokhtamysh, khan of the Golden Horde, and the warlord and conqueror Timur, founder of the Timurid Empire, in the areas of the Caucasus mountains, Turkistan and Eastern Europe. The battle between the two Mongol rulers played a key role in the decline of the Mongol power over early Rus' principalities.

Background
In the late 1370s and early 1380s, Timur helped Tokhtamysh assume supreme power in the White Horde against Tokhtamysh's uncle Urus Khan. After this Tokhtamysh united the White and Blue Hordes, reuniting the Golden Horde, and launched a massive military punitive campaign against the Russian principalities between 1381 and 1382, restoring Turco-Mongol (Tatar) power in Russia after the defeat in the Battle of Kulikovo. The Golden Horde, after a period of anarchy between the early 1360s and late 1370s, briefly reestablished itself as a dominant regional power, defeating Lithuania around 1383. But Tokhtamysh had territorial ambitions in Persia and Central Asia, and on account of this he turned against his old ally, Timur.

The war

After the death of Abu Sa'id in 1335, the last ruler of the Ilkhanid Dynasty, a power vacuum emerged in Persia. Persia's vulnerability led to military incursions from Persia's neighbours. In 1383 Timur started his military conquest of that country. In 1385 he captured Herat, Khorasan and all of eastern Persia. In the same year Tokhtamysh raided Azerbaijan and northwestern Iran.

In 1386, the city of Tabriz was plundered and Tokhtamysh retired with a rich booty. Between 1389 and 1391 there was intense fighting between Timur's forces and the Golden Horde. The first phase was won by Timur at the Battle of the Kondurcha River. Despite the setback, Tokhtamysh recovered his position and in the spring of 1395 raided the Timurid territory of Shirvan.

In 1395, Timur launched his final assault on the Golden Horde. He decisively routed Tokhtamysh in the Battle of the Terek river on 15 April 1395. All the major cities of the khanate were destroyed: Sarai, Ukek, Majar, Azaq, Tana and Astrakhan. Timur's attack on the cities of the Golden Horde in 1395 produced his first Western European victims, since it caused the destruction of the Italian trading colonies (comptoirs) in Sarai, Tana and Astrakhan. During the siege of Tana, the trading communities sent representatives to treat with Timur, but the latter only used them in a ruse to reconnoiter the city. The Genoese city of Caffa on the Crimean peninsula was spared, despite being a former ally of Tokhtamysh.

Aftermath
After his resounding defeat in the Battle of the Terek River, Tokhtamysh was deposed and replaced by Edigu, fleeing to the Ukrainian steppes and asking for help from Grand Duke Vytautas of Lithuania. The two combined their forces in the Battle of the Vorskla River in 1399, but were crushingly defeated by Khan Temur Qutlugh and Edigu, two of Timur's generals. Around 1406 Tokhtamysh was killed in Siberia by Edigu's men; Edigu, in turn, would be slain thirteen years later by one of Tokhtamysh's sons. 
The Golden Horde never recovered from this war. In the middle of the 15th century, it fragmented into smaller khanates: the Kazan khanate, Nogai Horde, Qasim Khanate, Crimean Khanate and Astrakhan Khanate. Thus Tatar-Mongol power in Russia was weakened and in 1480 the 'Tatar yoke' over Russia, a reminder of the bloody Mongol conquest, was definitively shaken in the Great standing on the Ugra River. The last remnant of the Golden Horde was destroyed by the Crimean Khanate in 1502, and the Khanates that arose after the Golden Horde's fragmentation were annexed by Muscovite Russia between the 1550s and early 17th century. The Crimean Khanate survived until 1783, under Ottoman protection. The Kazakh khanate survived until mid 19th century.

See also
Karsakpay inscription
The last of Thartay kin

References

Sources 

Wars involving the Golden Horde
Military history of the Timurid Empire
1380s conflicts
1390s conflicts
1380s in Asia
1390s in Asia
1390s in Europe
1380s in Europe